José Cortés may refer to:

José Cortés de Madariaga (1766–1826), Chilean patriot
Juan Donoso Cortés (1809–1853), Spanish counter-revolutionary, author, and theologian
José Cortés (footballer) (born 1994), Colombian footballer